In enzymology, a 6'-deoxychalcone synthase is an enzyme that catalyzes the chemical reaction

3 malonyl-CoA + 4-coumaroyl-CoA + NADPH + H+  4 CoA + isoliquiritigenin + 3 CO2 + NADP+ + H2O

The 4 substrates of this enzyme are malonyl-CoA, 4-coumaroyl-CoA, NADPH, and H+, whereas its 5 products are CoA, isoliquiritigenin, CO2, NADP+, and H2O. Deoxychalcone synthase catalyzed activity is involved in the biosynthesis of retrochalcone and certain phytoalexins in the cells of Glycyrrhiza echinata (Russian licorice) and other leguminous plants.

This enzyme belongs to the family of transferases, to be specific those acyltransferases transferring groups other than aminoacyl groups.  The systematic name of this enzyme class is malonyl-CoA:4-coumaroyl-CoA malonyltransferase (cyclizing, reducing).

References 

 

EC 2.3.1
NADPH-dependent enzymes
Enzymes of unknown structure